All the Joy in the World is Jump5's first Christmas album, released on October 22, 2002. Their covers of "Joy to the World", "A Strange Way to Save the World" and "Sleigh Ride" were released to Christian contemporary hit radio (CHR) and adult contemporary radio on the week of October 31, 2002, just in time for the Christmas and holiday season of that year.  The album is a mix of both traditional and modern Christmas covers. "A Strange Way to Save the World" is a cover of a 4Him song from their album "The Season of Love". The album charted at No. 10 on the Billboard Top Holiday Albums chart and No. 16 on their Top Christian Albums charts.

Track listing

References

Notes

Jump5 albums
2002 Christmas albums
Christmas albums by American artists
Pop Christmas albums